Arianna Bogatec (born 16 June 1969) is an Italian sailor. She competed in the 1992 Summer Olympics and the 1996 Summer Olympics.

She participated at the 2015 Barcolana regatta.

References

1969 births
Living people
Sportspeople from Trieste
Italian female sailors (sport)
Olympic sailors of Italy
Sailors at the 1992 Summer Olympics – Europe
Sailors at the 1996 Summer Olympics – Europe